Junction City High School may refer to:

Junction City High School (Arkansas), Junction City, Arkansas
Junction City High School (Oregon), Junction City, Oregon
Junction City High School (Kansas), Junction City, Kansas
Old Junction City High School, a historic building listed on the National Register of Historic Places in Junction City, Kansas